Typha joannis is a plant species native to Mongolia and Amur. The species grows in freshwater marshes and on the banks of lakes and rivers.

References

joannis
Freshwater plants
Flora of Russia
Flora of Mongolia
Plants described in 2001